Louis-Charles Greffulhe (9 February 1814 – 27 September 1888) was a French count and politician. He was the eldest son of Jean-Henry-Louis Greffulhe and his wife, Marie-Françoise-Célestine-Gabrielle de Vintimille du Luc. Célestine de Vintimille de Luc was a granddaughter of Charles de Vintimille, and the great-great-great-great granddaughter of adventuress Hortense Mancini

He served as a member of the Chamber of Peers from 1839 to 1848. He was a supporter of King Louis-Philippe.

References

1814 births
1888 deaths
Politicians from Rouen
Members of the Chamber of Peers (France)